Gail Kathryn Anderson-Dargatz (born November 14, 1963) is a Canadian novelist.

Anderson-Dargatz was born in Kamloops, British Columbia, and grew up in Salmon Arm. She studied creative writing at the University of Victoria and taught in the MFA program at UBC. She published her debut short story collection The Miss Hereford Stories in 1994, and received a nomination for the Stephen Leacock Memorial Medal for Humour in 1995.

Her first novel, The Cure for Death by Lightning (1996), was an experimental yet accessible work whose story unfolded partly through narrative and partly through a collection of recipes and household tips belonging to the narrator's mother. A Canadian bestseller that year, it won the Ethel Wilson Fiction Prize, and was nominated for the Giller Prize and the Books in Canada First Novel Award.

Her second novel, A Recipe for Bees, was published in 1998. Based on her own parents' early relationship, her process of researching the book led her parents to rekindle their romance after having divorced in 1981, and ultimately to their remarriage to each other. The book was a Giller Prize finalist in 1998.

She has since published the novels A Rhinestone Button (2002), Turtle Valley (2007) and The Spawning Grounds (2016).

Bibliography

Short story collections 
 The Miss Hereford Stories (1994) –

Novels 
 The Cure for Death by Lightning (1996) – 
 A Recipe for Bees (1998) – 
 A Rhinestone Button (2002) – /
 Turtle Valley (2007) – 
 The Spawning Grounds (2016)
 The Almost Wife (2021)

References

External links
 
 Archives of Gail Anderson-Dargats (Gail Anderson Dargatz fonds, R11697) are held at Library and Archives Canada

1963 births
Living people
20th-century Canadian novelists
21st-century Canadian novelists
People from Salmon Arm
Canadian women novelists
University of Victoria alumni
Canadian women short story writers
20th-century Canadian women writers
21st-century Canadian women writers
20th-century Canadian short story writers
21st-century Canadian short story writers
Writers from British Columbia